Sohini Ramachandran is professor at Brown University known for her work in evolutionary biology and population genetics.

Early life and education 
Ramachandran's parents were both professors. In the summer before her senior year of high school, Ramachandran completed a research project in plant genomics under the guidance of Marcus Feldman, which won her the fourth place prize in the 1998 Westinghouse Science Talent Search, where when she was the youngest finalist in the group. Ramachandran earned a B.S. from Stanford University in 2002. She went on to complete a Ph.D. at Stanford University in the Department of Biological Sciences, advised by Marcus Feldman. Her dissertation research was dissertation was titled "The signature of historical migrations on human population genetic data." Following her PhD, she was in the Harvard Society of Fellows as a postdoctoral researcher with John Wakeley in Harvard University's Department of Organismic and Evolutionary Biology. She moved to Brown University in 2010 and was promoted to professor in 2021. In 2019, she was a fellow at the Swedish Collegium for Advanced Study.

Research 
Ramachandran's research group uses statistical and mathematical modeling techniques to study evolutionary biology and population genetics. Her early research examined the genetic relationships originating within people from Africa, where she showed that diversity decreases as distance from Africa increases. She has also investigated the use of genetic tools to track infectious diseases and shown that while more outbreaks are occurring, fewer people are getting infected. She has also shown a lack of genetic evidence for selection for language at the FOXP2 site.

Selected publications

Honors and awards 
In 2012, Ramachandran received a Sloan Research Fellowship and was named a Pew Scholar. From Brown University she has received the Henry Merritt Wriston Fellowship (2016) and the Philip J. Bray Award for excellence in teaching. In 2019, she received a Presidential Early Career Award in Science and Engineering.

References

External links 
 Research group website

External links 

Living people
Stanford University alumni
Brown University faculty
Women geneticists
Year of birth missing (living people)